Partee is a surname. Notable people with the surname include:

Barbara Partee (born 1940), American semanticist
Cecil A. Partee (1921–1994), American politician
Clarence L. Partee (1864–1915), American composer, arranger and music publisher
Dennis Partee (born 1946), American football player
Roy Partee (1917–2000), American baseball player